Sergei Sergeevich Simonov (July 25, 1992 – January 7, 2016) was a Russian professional ice hockey player. He played with HC Lipetsk of the Russian Hockey League.

Simonov played three games with Metallurg Novokuznetsk of the Kontinental Hockey League during the 2010–11 season. He died after spleen surgery on January 7, 2016, at the age of 23.

References

External links

 ВХЛ

1992 births
2016 deaths
Metallurg Novokuznetsk players
HC Lada Togliatti players
HC Temirtau players
Kuznetskie Medvedi players
Saryarka Karagandy players
Sputnik Nizhny Tagil players
Russian ice hockey centres
People from Novokuznetsk
Sportspeople from Kemerovo Oblast